The 2009–10 Chicago Blackhawks season was the 84th season for the National Hockey League franchise that was established on September 25, 1926. The season began on October 2, 2009, with a pair of games against the Florida Panthers in Helsinki, and ended on June 9, 2010, when the Blackhawks defeated the Philadelphia Flyers 4–3 in the 2010 Stanley Cup Final, giving the organization its first NHL championship since 1961 and fourth overall. For the first time since the 1996–97 season, the Blackhawks made the playoffs in back-to-back seasons. The 2009–10 Chicago Blackhawks were voted by fans on NHL.com as one of the top 20 greatest teams in NHL history.

In May 2021, two former players from the 2009–10 Blackhawks roster publicly accused the team's video coach at the time of sexually assaulting them during this season, sparking controversy.

Off-season
The Blackhawks were coming off one of their best years in recent history during the 2008–09 season, going 46–24–12 and finishing with 104 points. They finished second in the Central Division and fourth in the Western Conference. The Blackhawks' 46 wins were their most since winning 47 in the 1992–93 NHL season. The Blackhawks' reached the 100-point mark for the first time since 1992–93 season and improved by 16 points over the past season, when their 88-point total left them three points away of a playoff berth. They were the only NHL to improve on its record in each of the previous four seasons. The Blackhawks made it to the playoffs for the first time since 2002 and it was their second playoff appearance in the previous 11 years. In the playoffs, the Blackhawks defeated the Calgary Flames and the Vancouver Canucks before losing to the Detroit Red Wings in the Western Conference Finals. It was the Blackhawks' first appearance in the Western Conference Finals since 1995.

The Blackhawks, however, had a turbulent off-season. The Blackhawks saw Assistant General Manager Rick Dudley resign from his position and join the Atlanta Thrashers as associate general manager. On July 1, 2009, the Blackhawks made a significant acquisition to the team when they signed five-time NHL All-Star Marian Hossa to a 12 year contract worth $62.8 million. At the time, it was the most lucrative deal in team history.  The signing of Hossa by the Blackhawks coincided with the departure of the team's leading scorer from the previous season, Martin Havlat, to the Minnesota Wild. Other key additions for the Blackhawks were John Madden and Tomas Kopecky. Along with Havlat, Nikolai Khabibulin, Samuel Pahlsson and Matt Walker were notable losses for the team.

Shortly after signing Hossa, the team disclosed that he was still rehabilitating a shoulder injury he sustained during the previous post-season. He underwent shoulder surgery and ended up missing the first 22 games of the season. During the off-season, The NHL Players' Association (NHLPA) filed a grievance, stating that the Blackhawks missed the deadline for giving qualifying offers to restricted free agents. This caused General Manager Dale Tallon to quickly sign eight players to make sure they did not end up as unrestricted free agents. The mistake proved to be a large influence in the removing of Tallon as general manager. He was replaced with Stan Bowman, the assistant general manager and son of Hockey Hall of Fame coach Scotty Bowman. The NHL also investigated Hossa's contract as well. The Blackhawks named Kevin Cheveldayoff, the general manager of the Chicago Wolves of the American Hockey League (AHL), as assistant general manager. The team also promoted Assistant Coach Marc Bergevin to the position of director of player personnel.

In August, the Blackhawks saw star player Patrick Kane embroiled in controversy when he and his cousin were arrested in Buffalo, New York. Kane was apprehended in the early morning hours after allegedly punching a cab driver when he claimed to not have proper change for their trip fare. Kane was charged with second-degree robbery, a Class C felony and fourth-degree criminal mischief and theft-of-services, both of which were Class A misdemeanors. He pleaded not guilty. On August 17, Kane apologized for the arrest. Kane and his cousin appeared before a grand jury on August 19. While they were cleared of any felony charges, the two were still indicted on misdemeanor assault, theft and harassment charges. Kane and his cousin reiterated their not guilty pleas when appearing in court the next day. On August 27, Kane and his cousin pleaded guilty to noncriminal disorderly conduct charges, and were both given conditional discharges.

The Blackhawks entered the 2009–10 season with high expectations. Bob Duff of NBC Sports predicted that the Blackhawks would finish with 101 points, finish second in the division and be a fourth seed in the Western Conference. Jim Neveau of The Hockey Writer's wrote that the Blackhawks would win the division and be a second seed in the conference.

Regular season
On October 12, the Calgary Flames scored the first five goals in the first period, but the Blackhawks rallied to win 6–5 in overtime.
On November 25, the Blackhawks scored three short-handed goals in a 7–2 win over the San Jose Sharks
On April 6, the Blackhawks won their 50th game of the season against the Dallas Stars, setting a new franchise record for wins in a season.
On April 7, the 'Hawks notched their 109th point of the season against the St. Louis Blues, setting another franchise record.
On April 9, the 'Hawks won their 23rd game of the season on the road against the Colorado Avalanche, setting yet another franchise record.

The 'Hawks had solid goaltending during the regular season, finishing first in the League in shutouts, with 11. They also led the NHL in shorthanded goals scored, with 13.

Playoffs

The Chicago Blackhawks have qualified for the playoffs in back-to-back years for the first time since 1996 and 1997.
The Blackhawks have won their division for the first time since the 1992–93 season.
The Blackhawks have reached the Western Conference Finals for the 2nd year in a row.
On May 18, the Blackhawks tied an NHL playoff record of 7 straight wins on the road.
Jonathan Toews set a franchise playoff record on May 21 by earning a point in 12 consecutive games, breaking Stan Mikita's record. His streak ended at 13 games after failing to register a point in game one of the 2010 Stanley Cup Finals
On May 23, the Blackhawks won their first Conference Final since the 1991–92 season.
Marian Hossa became the first player in history to make three consecutive Stanley Cup Finals with three different teams after accomplishing the feat with the 2008 Pittsburgh Penguins and 2009 Detroit Red Wings
Jonathan Toews became the 25th member of hockey's Triple Gold Club after winning the Stanley Cup with the Blackhawks, an Olympic gold medal with Canada earlier in the year, and a World Championship, also with Canada, in 2007.

Sexual abuse scandal
In May 2021, two former Blackhawks players accused former video coach Brad Aldrich of sexually assaulting them during the 2009–10 season, with one player, initially staying anonymous under the moniker "John Doe", alleging that Aldrich also threatened him physically, emotionally, and financially after an off-ice assault. John Doe filed lawsuit against the Blackhawks for failing to adequately address Aldrich's wrongdoings or to file police reports.

According to a months-long independent investigation by law firm Jenner & Block that was sanctioned by the team, on May 23, 2010, Blackhawks executives held a meeting about the sexual assault claims and decided they would not address them until after the Stanley Cup Playoffs. The matter was not discussed again, and on June 14, 2010, five days after Chicago won the Stanley Cup, the Blackhawks human resources director gave Aldrich the option to resign or face termination if John Doe's claims turned out to be true. Aldrich chose to resign and was permitted to participate in postseason celebrations, according to the investigation findings. He then went on to work for University of Notre Dame and later Miami University, where he resigned in 2012 after he was accused of sexual assault there, and was convicted of having sexual contact with a minor in 2013 while serving as a high school coach in Houghton, Michigan. As a result, Aldrich is accused or convicted of sexual assaults in connection with coaching jobs at the NHL, college, and high school levels. In October 2021, Kyle Beach gave an interview on SportsCentre confirming that he was John Doe, and spoke about his experiences with the Blackhawks organization after the fact.

In the fallout of the investigation, on October 26, 2021, the Blackhawks announced that general manager and hockey operations president Stan Bowman and senior vice president of hockey operations Al MacIsaac, the two remaining executives from the 2009–10 team, resigned after the lead investigator stated that Bowman's failure to report the alleged assault had eventually led to the perpetrator committing further acts of sexual abuse. The Blackhawks  appointed Kyle Davidson to serve as the team's interim general manager. The NHL also fined the Blackhawks $2 million for "inadequate internal procedures and insufficient and untimely response in the handling of matters related to former video coach Brad Aldrich's employment." Quenneville, who was by then the head coach of the Florida Panthers, resigned from that position on October 28 after meeting with NHL commissioner Gary Bettman. Blackhawks owner Rocky Wirtz also requested that Aldrich's name be stricken from the Stanley Cup. The Hockey Hall of Fame granted the request and had Aldrich's name covered with X's. The Blackhawks reached a confidential settlement with Beach on December 15. The second case filed by the former Michigan high school student was dismissed in December.

Schedule and results

Division standings

Conference standings

Pre-season
Legend:

*Games against non-NHL teams don't count in the standings.

Regular season

Playoffs

Player statistics

Skaters
Note: GP = Games played; G = Goals; A = Assists; Pts = Points; PIM = Penalty minutes

Goaltenders
Note: GP = Games played; TOI = Time on ice (minutes); W = Wins; L = Losses; OT = Overtime losses; GA = Goals against; GAA= Goals against average; SA= Shots against; SV= Saves; Sv% = Save percentage; SO= Shutouts

†Denotes player spent time with another team before joining Blackhawks. Stats reflect time with the Blackhawks only.
‡Traded mid-season
Bold/italics denotes franchise record

Detailed records

Awards and records

Awards

Milestones

Transactions
The Blackhawks have been involved in the following transactions during the 2009–10 season.

Trades

Free agents acquired

Free agents lost

Claimed via waivers

Lost via waivers

Player signings

Draft picks

The 2009 NHL Entry Draft was hosted at Bell Centre in Montreal on June 26 and 27. The Blackhawks made a total of six picks.

See also
 2009–10 NHL season

References

External links
2009–10 Chicago Blackhawks season Official Site
2009–10 Chicago Blackhawks season at ESPN
2009–10 Chicago Blackhawks season at Hockey Reference
2009–10 Chicago Blackhawks season at Chicago Tribune

Chicago Blackhawks seasons
Chicago Blackhawks season, 2009-10
Western Conference (NHL) championship seasons
Stanley Cup championship seasons
Chicago
Det
Chic
Chic